Louis Verreydt (25 November 1950 –  13 August 1977) was a Belgian cyclist. He competed in the team time trial at the 1972 Summer Olympics. He died of a heart attack in 1977.

References

External links
 

1950 births
1977 deaths
Belgian male cyclists
Olympic cyclists of Belgium
Cyclists at the 1972 Summer Olympics
Cyclists from Antwerp
UCI Road World Champions (elite men)